Omsk Giftedness Development Center (or, officially, Multidisciplinary Educational Center for Giftedness Development) is a secondary education institution in Russia, specified in the training for science olympiads in different school subjects, such as mathematics and physics. It is placed in the Neftyaniki District of Omsk and regularly takes high places in the various ratings of Russian educational centers.

History 
The center was opened in 1962 as Omsk State School 117, a usual soviet secondary school. The school has the quarters on Andrianova str., 4, in the Neftyaniki District (which is, in practice, a satellite town of Omsk, built for Omsk Oil Refinery).

In 2002, several specialists in the training for science olympiads, notably Irina Chernyavskaya and Vladimir Davydenko, left Lyceum 64, then a leading educational center of Omsk, and chose to work in the school 117. This gave an impulse for the development of the school: in 2004, an agreement about the cooperation with Omsk State University was made, and a new headmaster, Svetlana Boykova, was appointed; in 2007, the school received the status of gimnasium; in 2008, there were two winners of International Mathematical Olympiad, Nikita Kudyk and Konstantin Matveev.

In 2015, it obtained a special status in the educational system of Omsk Oblast, becoming a Multidisciplinary Educational Center for Giftedness Development. It meant that it now trains students not only from Omsk, but from the whole region, accommodating a dormitory to include students from other cities.

References 

Gymnasiums in Russia
Omsk
Education in Omsk Oblast
1962 establishments in Russia
Educational institutions established in 1962